Ukrainophilia is the love of or identification with Ukraine and Ukrainians; its opposite is Ukrainophobia. The term is used primarily in a political and cultural context. "Ukrainophilia" and "Ukrainophile" are the terms used to denote pro-Ukrainian sentiments, usually in politics and literature. Ukrainophilia was severely persecuted by the imperial Russian government, and Ukrainian-language books and theater were banned. Pro-Ukrainian sentiments have gained more popularity after the Russian Invasion of Ukraine in 2022.

History of Ukrainophilia 

Ukrainophilia arose as a movement in Poland in the first half of the 19th century, among Polish writers of the so-called "Ukrainian school" and later among ethnic Poles in Ukraine, who wrote poems and songs in the Ukrainian language. The Ukrainophile movement also developed among ethnic Ukrainian intellectuals in the Russian Empire and Galicia in the second half of the 19th century. Ukrainophiles sought to preserve and develop the Ukrainian language, literature and culture. They called for the introduction of the Ukrainian language in Ukrainian schools and the autonomy from the Russian Empire, that would allow for national self-determination of Ukrainians and free development of Ukrainian culture.

Ukrainophilia in the 19th century included various degrees of intensity, from the simple love of one's people all the way to passionate nationalism and independence.

The Ukrainophile movement in Russian literature led to the publishing of books and textbooks in the Ukrainian language. Ukrainophile intellectuals published a number of journals: Osnova in St. Petersburg (1861–62), Chernigovskiy Listok, Samostaine Slovo, Hromadnytsia, Pomyinytsia. They also sought to popularize the Ukrainian language by publishing pamphlets in Ukrainian. Ukrainophiles of the Russian Empire also created a network of Ukrainophile organizations, the most important of which were in St. Petersburg, Moscow, Kyiv, Kharkiv, Chernihiv, Poltava and Odessa, which actively sought to organize Ukrainian-language instruction in schools.

In the first half of the 19th century, many Ukrainophiles were also Polish nationalists, who sought to recreate the Polish-Lithuanian Commonwealth with Ukrainian culture as a "regional" part of a "Polish world". After the 1830-31 Polish uprising against the Russian Empire, Polish Ukrainophiles and Ukrainians of Polish origins, seeking allies against Russia, played a major role in the Ukrainian cultural movements and fomented anti-Russian sentiment by referring to the Ukrainians as Rus''' which they distinguished from Muscovy (Russia).

After the Russian Empire crushed the Polish uprising of 1863, the Russian government put intense pressure on the Ukrainophile movement (Valuyev Circular in 1863, Ems Ukaz in 1876), but the movement continued flaring up, especially in early 1870s and late 1880s. After the movement was repressed, most of its members turned their attention away from political organizing to literary work, such as creating Ukrainian dictionaries, writing Ukrainian books, developing the discipline of Ukrainian studies.  During the Soviet period the Ukrainophile movement was characterized as a "burgeois-national" movement.

 Ukrainophilia today 
Ukrainophilia exists among the Ukrainian diaspora in Russia, North America and elsewhere.

Canada
Canadians show many Ukrainophile tendencies, owing in part to a large Ukrainian diaspora.

Israel
In the 1990s many Jewish people emigrated from the former Soviet states, especially from Ukraine, to Israel. Jewish Ukrainians had lived in Ukraine for centuries, having partially assimilated, intermarried and adopted the culture of the people that they lived among. Even today many Ukrainian Jews in Israel feel a sense of connection to and pride with Ukraine, and are still influenced by Ukrainian culture, language and food.

Poland
Some Poles are also quite Ukrainophilic today, especially those that supported Ukraine's sovereignty. Despite Poland being one of Ukraine's closest allies and trade partners, Ukrainophobia and anti-Ukrainian stereotypes prevail in Polish society. Prior to World War II, the Second Polish Republic restricted rights of people who declared Ukrainian nationality, belonged to the Eastern Orthodox Church and inhabited the Eastern Borderlands, in reaction to a wave of sabotage and terrorist attacks perpetrated by Ukrainian nationalists.

See also

 Ukrainian nationalism
 Slavophile
 Ukrainization
 Ukrainophobia
 Ukrainophone

 Notes 

References

Sources
 Іван Куций. УКРАЇНОФІЛЬСЬКА ТЕЧІЯ ГАЛИЦЬКОЇ ІСТОРІОГРАФІЇ XIX ст.: КОНЦЕПТУАЛІЗАЦІЯ ІСТОРИЧНО-ЦИВІЛІЗАЦІЙНОЇ ІДЕНТИЧНОСТІ // Історіографічні дослідження в Україні. Випуск 18. Київ: Інститут історії України НАН України, 2008
 Житецький І. Київ. Громада за 60-их років, ж. Україна, 1928, кн. 1;
 Савченко Ф. Заборона українства 1876 p. K. 1930 (2 вид. Мюнхен 1970, де подано докладну бібліографію). Чимало мемуарного матеріалу в ж. Україна, 1924 — 30 pp. і в зб. За сто літ, І — VI.
 Енциклопедія українознавства.'' У 10-х т. / Гол. ред. Володимир Кубійович. — Париж; Нью-Йорк: Молоде Життя, 1954–1989.

Foreign relations of Ukraine
Political history of Ukraine
Society of Ukraine
Admiration of foreign cultures
National revivals
Ukrainian nationalism
Cultural regions